Hacky can refer to:

 A hack: inelegant improvisation of computer code
 Hačky, a Czech village

See also 
 Hacky sack (footbag)